Anzur Umamudinovich Sadirov (born 4 October 1978) is a Russian professional football coach and a former player.

Playing career
He made his Russian Football National League debut for FC Dynamo Makhachkala on 28 March 2004 in a game against FC Lisma-Mordovia Saransk. He played 6 seasons in the FNL for Dynamo Makhachkala, FC Baltika Kaliningrad, FC Dynamo Bryansk and FC Volgar-Gazprom Astrakhan.

Personal life
His younger brother Artur Sadirov was also a professional footballer.

External links
 

1978 births
People from Dagestan
Living people
Russian footballers
Association football midfielders
Russian expatriate footballers
Expatriate footballers in Azerbaijan
FC Baltika Kaliningrad players
FC Fakel Voronezh players
FC Volgar Astrakhan players
Russian football managers
FC Anzhi Makhachkala players
FC Dynamo Bryansk players
FC Dynamo Makhachkala players
Sportspeople from Dagestan